Thakurdwar is a neighbourhood in Mumbai. It is known for its jewellers and Maharashtrian community.

References

Neighbourhoods in Mumbai
Jewellery districts
Villages in Mumbai City district